Perevolochan is a rural locality (a village) in Tatyr-Uzyaksky Selsoviet, Khaybullinsky District, Bashkortostan, Russia. The population was 67 as of 2010. There is 1 street.

Geography 
Perevolochan is located 20 km northwest of Akyar (the district's administrative centre) by road. Tatyr-Uzyak is the nearest rural locality.

References 

Rural localities in Khaybullinsky District